Arene socorroensis is a species of sea snail, a marine gastropod mollusk in the family Areneidae.

Description
The height of the shell attains 5 mm, its diameter 6 mm. The teleoconch contains 4 whorls, the protoconch about one whorl. The spiral cords are strong. The axial ribs are faint or absent. The body whorl contains about 8 unequal spiral cords.

Distribution
This marine species occurs off Socorro Island in the intertidal zone.

References

 A.M. Strong (1934) West American species of the genus Liotia; Transactions of The San Diego Society For Natural History vol. 7 (1934)

External links
 To Biodiversity Heritage Library (1 publication)
 To World Register of Marine Species

Areneidae
Gastropods described in 1934